
Boyd County Public Schools is a school district based in Boyd County, Kentucky. The district serves the area within Catlettsburg and the rest of Boyd County, excluding the city of Ashland and the census-designated place of Westwood, each of which has its own school district.

Schools 
 Boyd County High School - Grades 9 to 12
 Ramey-Estep High School - Grades 6 to 12
 Boyd County Central - Alternative School Grades 6 to 12
 Boyd County Career and Technical Education Center - Grades 9 to 12
 Boyd County Middle School - Grades  6 to 8

Primary schools (Grades K to 5) 
Cannonsburg Elementary
Catlettsburg Elementary
Ponderosa Elementary
Summit Elementary

Early Childhood Learning Centers (Head Start/Preschool) 
Early Childhood Learning Center - North
Early Childhood Learning Center - South
Catlettsburg Preschool

External links

 Boyd County Public Schools

School districts in Kentucky
Education in Boyd County, Kentucky